Wu Qian (born ), also known as Janice Wu, is a Chinese actress. She rose to fame for portraying the younger counterpart of Zhao Mosheng in the 2015 hit romance drama My Sunshine, and gained attention for her roles in the television series My Amazing Boyfriend (2016), Fighter of the Destiny (2017),  The Brightest Star in the Sky (2019), Le Coup de Foudre (2019), and Skate into Love (2020).

Career
Wu made her acting debut in 2014 with a minor role in Heroes of Sui and Tang Dynasties 3 & 4. She became known for her role in the wuxia drama The Deer and the Cauldron, playing Mu Jianping.

In 2015, Wu starred as the younger counterpart of Zhao Mosheng in the hit romance drama My Sunshine, gaining popularity for her portrayal. The following year, she played her first lead role in the romance comedy series My Amazing Boyfriend (2016). The series was a success and gained more than 2 billion views by the end of its run.

In 2017, Wu starred in the hit fantasy drama Fighter of the Destiny. The role of Luo Luo endeared her to the audience and contributed to her rise in popularity. The same year, Wu reunited with My Sunshine co-star Luo Yunxi in the fantasy romance drama A Life Time Love.

In 2018, Wu had a guest role in the palace drama Ruyi's Royal Love in the Palace, where she played an antagonistic character for the first time. The same year, she starred in the fantasy action drama Oriental Odyssey alongside Zheng Yecheng.

In 2019, Wu starred alongside Huang Zitao in the music romance drama The Brightest Star in the Sky. The same year, she starred in the romance web series Le Coup de Foudre.

In 2020, Wu starred in the sports romance drama Skate into Love alongside Zhang Xincheng.
In 2021, it was confirmed that she and her Le Coup de Foudre co-star Zhang Yujian are indeed married and have a daughter together. In 2022, they divorced.

Filmography

Film

Television series

Television show

Music video

Discography

Awards and nominations

References

External links
 

1993 births
Living people
Actresses from Hubei
People from Ezhou
21st-century Chinese actresses
Chinese television actresses
Chinese film actresses